Karicode or Karikodu is a neighbourhood of Kollam city in India. It is about 5 km away from Kollam city centre. Karicode is the 23rd ward in Kollam Municipal Corporation council. The place is very famous because of the educational institutions by TKM Group(Thangal Kunju Musaliar Group). Thangal Kunju Musaliar College of Engineering in Kollam is the first self-financing engineering college in Kerala state. The college, established in 1958, is to be considered as the pioneers in engineering education in Kerala. TKM Arts & Science college is also situated at Karicode.

Importance
Karicode is one among the cashew processing hubs of Kollam. It was a part of Kilikollur panchayath before. Kilikollur has the maximum number of cashew processing factories in India. When Kollam Municipality was upgraded as city corporation in the year 2000, Karicode also merged with Kollam along with Kilikollur.
The congested National Highway stretch passing through Karicode is making the place a traffic black-spot in Kollam city. So many accidents happened in Karicode area because of the congested, under developed NH stretch.

Kilikollur railway station is situated in Karicode.

Bharat Sanchar Nigam Limited is planning to provide high-speed Wi-Fi hotspot in Karicode, considering the importance of the place as a major educational hub in the state.

Transport
Karicode is situated on National Highway 744 or NH 744 connecting the city of Kollam with Tamil Nadu. Nearest railway station is Kilikollur railway station, situated at Karicode. But only 7 passenger trains and one express train stops here. However, Kollam Junction railway station situated at a distance of 6 km from here connects all the major cities of India by rail.

Educational Institutions in Karicode
The following Educational Institutions are located in and around Karicode.
T K M College of Engineering 
T.K.M. College of Arts and Science 
Sivaram NSS Higher Secondary School 
T.K.M Higher Secondary School 
MEA English Medium Higher Secondary School 
Amrita Vidyalayam 
Chathinamkulam MSM Higher Secondary School 
Karicode Gvt Lower Primary School 
TKM Centenary Public School 
T.K.M. Kindergarten

References

Neighbourhoods in Kollam